Oncopeltus aulicus is a species of seed bug in the family Lygaeidae, found in Florida and the Caribbean.

References

External links

 

Lygaeidae
Insects described in 1775